DWJZ (102.7 FM), broadcasting as 102.7 Radyo Polangui, is a radio station owned and operated by Allied Broadcasting Center. Its studios are located at the 2nd Floor, Polangui Commercial Arcade, Brgy. Basud, Polangui.

The station was formerly owned by Manila Broadcasting Company under the Hot FM network from 2002 to 2015.

References

Radio stations in Albay
Radio stations established in 2002
2002 establishments in the Philippines